Christmas Past (April 15, 1979 – December 13, 2008) was an American Thoroughbred Champion racehorse. She was the American Champion Three-Year-Old Filly of 1982 when her wins included the Coaching Club American Oaks and the Monmouth Oaks.

Background
Christmas Past was bred and owned by Cynthia Phipps of the famous Phipps racing family. She was out of the mare Yule Log, a daughter of eight-time leading sire in North America and U.S. Racing Hall of Fame inductee Bold Ruler. Her sire was the 1964 French Champion Two-Year-Old Colt, Grey Dawn. She was conditioned for racing by Angel Penna, Jr.

Racing career
As a three-year-old in 1982, Christmas Past won five stakes races for fillies including the Coaching Club American Oaks by six lengths. Her performances earned her 1982 American Champion Three-Year-Old Filly honors.

At age four, Christmas Past defeated her male counterparts in winning the February 26 Grade 1 Gulfstream Park Handicap in Florida. It marked only the second time in the thirty-seven year history of the race that a filly had won. A week later her owner decided to retire her from racing saying it was because of a variety of minor physical ailments that could hamper her running especially when she would be required to compete under heavy handicap weights that could increase the risk of a serious injury.

Retirement and stud
Retired to broodmare duty at Claiborne Farm in Paris, Kentucky, Christmas Past produced ten foals between 1985 and 2002, none of which won or placed in a stakes race.

At age twenty-nine, Christmas Past was humanely euthanized on December 13, 2008, due to complications from the infirmities of old age. She was buried in the Marchmont Cemetery at Claiborne Farm.

References
 Christmas Past's pedigree and partial racing stats

1979 racehorse births
2008 racehorse deaths
Racehorses bred in Kentucky
Racehorses trained in the United States
Eclipse Award winners
Phipps family
Thoroughbred family 9-c